Szczawinskia is a genus of leaf-dwelling lichens in the family Pilocarpaceae. Species Fungorum places the genus in family Byssolomataceae.
The genus contains five species. The genus was circumscribed by Canadian mycologist Alvin Funk in 1984, with Szczawinskia tsugae assigned as the type species.

The genus name of Szczawinskia is in honour of Adam Franciszek Szczawinski (1913–2006), who was a (Russian-) Canadian botanist from the University of Lemburg.

Species
Szczawinskia foliicola 
Szczawinskia leucopoda 
Szczawinskia phylicae 
Szczawinskia tsugae 
Former species;
Szczawinskia permira  = Uluguria permira Byssolomataceae

References

Pilocarpaceae
Lichen genera
Lecanorales genera
Taxa described in 1984